The Dixon Creek (a.k.a. Limestone Creek) is a creek in Texas.

It runs from north central Carson County through to Hutchinson County, all the way to the Canadian River. It flows through the 6666 Ranch near Panhandle, Texas and the Borger oilfield.

It was named in honor of Billy Dixon.

See also
List of rivers of Texas

References

Carson County, Texas
Hutchinson County, Texas
Rivers of Texas